Cerdistus erythrurus is a species of robber fly in the subfamily Asilinae. It is the type species of the genus Cerdistus.

Distribution
This species is present in Southern Europe (Austria, Bosnia and Herzegovina, Croatia, France, Greece, Italy, Switzerland and former Yugoslavia).

Description
These rather little robber flies are mainly black. Legs are black, with reddish tibiae. In males the modified last abdominal segment supporting the copulatory apparatus (hypopygium) may be partly reddish.

Adults can be found from May to July–August.

References

External links
 Geller-Grimm, F. (2011) Information on robber flies
 Diptères du Gard
 Les insectes
 Inaturalist

Asilinae